Valdis Muižnieks (February 22, 1935 – November 29, 2013) was a Latvian basketball player.

Muižnieks was born in Riga.  He played for Rīgas ASK and won 3 Euroleague titles (1958, 1959, 1960) and 4 Soviet national championships (1955, 1956, 1957, 1958). Honoured Master of Sport of the USSR (1959). 

Playing for Soviet national team, Muižnieks won 3 gold medals at Eurobasket 1957, Eurobasket 1959, Eurobasket 1961, and 3 silver medals at the Olympic Games (1956, 1960, 1964).

References

External links 
Profile at ASK (riga) site
basketpedya.com
euroleague.net
databasesports.com

1935 births
2013 deaths
ASK Riga players
Latvian men's basketball players
Soviet men's basketball players
1959 FIBA World Championship players
Olympic basketball players of the Soviet Union
Olympic silver medalists for the Soviet Union
Basketball players at the 1956 Summer Olympics
Basketball players at the 1960 Summer Olympics
Basketball players at the 1964 Summer Olympics
FIBA EuroBasket-winning players
Olympic medalists in basketball
Basketball players from Riga
Medalists at the 1964 Summer Olympics
Medalists at the 1960 Summer Olympics
Medalists at the 1956 Summer Olympics
Honoured Masters of Sport of the USSR